St George's Barracks, Sutton Coldfield was a military installation in Sutton Coldfield.

History
Originally built in 1942 as the home of 216 Maintenance Unit RAF, the site was renamed St George's Barracks and became the regional centre for infantry training as the Fusilier Brigade Depot in 1960. The barracks went on to be the army personnel selection centre for England, Wales and Northern Ireland in 1972. The Army personnel selection centre closed in early summer 1994 and most of the land was later sold off for housing. The Defence Infrastructure Organisation still remains in offices at St George's House.

References

Installations of the British Army
Barracks in England